Chey Chettha II (1576–1628) was a king of Cambodia who reigned from Oudong, about 40 km northwest of modern-day Phnom Penh, from 1618 to 1628. He was the son of King Srei Soriyopear (r. 1603–1618). He is noted for moving the royal capital from Srei Sonthor to Oudong, and for his cooperation with the Nguyễn Lords of Vietnam against the Siamese, which led to the Vietnamese annexation of the Mekong Delta, including the city of Prey Nokor—the precursor of modern-day Ho Chi Minh City.

In order to balance the influence of the Siamese forces, which had devastated the previous capital at Longvek during the reign of his father, Chey Chettha approached the Nguyễn lord for help. To cement the resulting alliance, Chey Chettha was married to Princess Nguyễn Phúc Ngọc Vạn, a daughter of Lord Nguyễn Phúc Nguyên, in 1618. In return, the king granted the Vietnamese the right to establish settlements in Mô Xoài (now Bà Rịa), in the region of Prey Nokor—which they colloquially referred to as Sài Gòn, and which later became Ho Chi Minh City.

In 1621, Chey Chettha initiated a major legal reform from his palace of Sras-Kev in Kompong Luong on the banks of the Mekong. He codified the laws and traditions into twelve volumes which were not reformed until the reign of King Norodom in 1872.

In 1623, Chey Chettha allowed the Vietnamese to set up a custom house at Prey Nokor, in order to collect taxes. This settlement was the start of a major expansion by the Vietnamese beyond the borders established by Lê Thánh Tông in 1471. The increasing waves of Vietnamese settlers which followed overwhelmed Chey Chettha II's kingdom—weakened as it was due to war with the Siamese—and slowly Vietnamized the Mekong Delta area, claiming it for their own in the 1690s.

The Dutch East India Company established ties with Cambodia in 1620, during Chey Chettha's reign; in 1623, they established an outpost at Kompong Luong, a riverside port near Oudong.

Family 
 Father: Srei Soriyopear (Barom Reachea IV or VII)
 Mother: Queen Sri Sujati
 Consorts and their respective issue:
 Ang Chov (Princess Ngọc Vạn) from Annam, a daughter of Lord Nguyễn Phúc Nguyên 
 Princess Ang Na Kshatriyi (married Batom Reachea I)
Suok
Ponhea To (Thommo Reachea II)
Thong
 Ponhea Nou (Ang Tong Reachea)
 Princess Ang Vathi (betrothed to Ponhea To but married Outey. Executed together with Ponhea To in 1630)
Anak Mnan Pussa from Lan Xang
Ponhea Chan (Sultan Ibrahim)

References

1576 births
1628 deaths
17th-century Cambodian monarchs